Berg Studios is an instructional, film and television acting studio and theatre space in Atwater Village, California in the Los Angeles area.  The Studio space is owned and run by acting instructor and Yale School of Drama graduate Gregory Berger-Sobeck, who has taught acting in Los Angeles since 1998.

Instructional Approach 
The technique and training is based on classical acting approaches of Constantin Stanislavski, with a physical acting approach and not solely from intellect.  Spontaneity, honesty, and originality in working from subtext are all explored.  The students are taught a repeatable system of work.

Awards

References

External links 
 

Schools of the performing arts in the United States
1998 establishments in California
Atwater Village, Los Angeles